Ali Tahir is a Pakistani actor, writer and director.He is born in 1970.Ali is known for his roles in Inkaar, Mehram, Sangat, Teen Bata Teen and many other dramas. He is son of known writer/actor Naeem Tahir and actor brother of Faran Tahir. He is married to Wajeeha Tahir, who is also actor and was a cast member of Teen Bata Teen.

Filmography

Film
 Chambaili

Television

References

External links

Living people
Pakistani male television actors
Pakistani male stage actors
Pakistani male comedians
Year of birth missing (living people)